Basie at Birdland is a 1961 live album by the Count Basie Orchestra that was recorded at Birdland in New York City.

Reception
The Allmusic review by Michael G. Nastos gave the album four stars, stating, "This has always been one of the more enjoyable live recordings from Basie and company, and still can be easily recommended for novices as well as aficionados of his unflappable ability to swing a band like nobody else."

Track listing 
 "Little Pony" (Neal Hefti) – 2:22
 "Basie" (Ernie Wilkins) – 3:23
 "Blues Backstage" (Frank Foster) – 4:58
 "Blee Blop Blues" (A. K. Salim) – 2:17
 "Whirly-Bird" (Hefti) – 3:59
 "One O'Clock Jump" (Count Basie) – 0:55
 "Good Time Blues" (Wilkins) – 6:40
 "Segue in C" (Frank Wess) – 9:18
 "One O'Clock Jump" – 4:41
 "Easin' It" (Foster) – 5:41
 "A Little Tempo, Please" (Hefti) – 3:02
 "Corner Pocket" (Freddie Green) – 5:07
 "I Needs to Be Bee'd With" (Quincy Jones) – 4:23
 "Discommotion" (Foster) – 4:16
 "Segue in C" (Wess) – 8:11
 "Whirly-Bird" – 3:43
 "One O'Clock Jump" – 1:02

Personnel 
 Count Basie – piano
 Sonny Cohn – trumpet
 Thad Jones – trumpet
 Leonard Johnson – trumpet
 Snooky Young – trumpet
 Benny Powell – trombone
 Quentin Jackson – trombone
 Henry Coker – trombone
 Marshal Royal – alto saxophone, clarinet
 Frank Wess – alto saxophone, tenor saxophone, flute
 Frank Foster – tenor saxophone
 Budd Johnson – tenor saxophone
 Charlie Fowlkes – baritone saxophone
 Freddie Green – guitar
 Eddie Jones – double bass
 Sonny Payne – drums
 Jon Hendricks – vocal

References 

1961 live albums
Count Basie Orchestra live albums
Roulette Records live albums
Albums recorded at Birdland